Megapomponia is a genus of cicadas from Southeast Asia containing the world's largest cicadas species. It now belongs to the subtribe Megapomponiina and was erected by Michel Boulard to accommodate the world's largest cicada species, Megapomponia imperatoria, the type species of Megapomponia. Boulard included seven species in Megapomponia. Lee and Sanborn, however, re-transferred two species to Pomponia, Pomponia decem and Pomponia rajah.

Species
 Megapomponia atrotunicata (Young June Lee and Allen F. Sanborn, 2010)
 Megapomponia castanea (Young June Lee and Allen F. Sanborn, 2010)
 Megapomponia clamorigravis (Michel Boulard, 2005)
 Megapomponia imperatoria (Westwood, 1842)
 Megapomponia intermedia (Distant, 1905)
 Megapomponia merula (Distant, 1905)
 Megapomponia pendleburyi (Michel Boulard, 2001)
 Megapomponia sitesi (Young June Lee and Allen F. Sanborn, 2010)

References

External links

Hemiptera of Asia
Dundubiini
Cicadidae genera